George Tupou I (4 December 1797 – 18 February 1893), originally known as Tāufaʻāhau I, was the first king of modern Tonga. He adopted the name Siaosi (originally Jiaoji), the Tongan equivalent of George, after King George III of the United Kingdom, when he was baptized in 1831. His nickname was Lopa-ukamea (or Lopa-ʻaione), meaning iron cable.

Biography

Birth 

George Tupou I was born around 1797 in Tonga. 4 December is often-quoted as his birthday and is a public holiday in Tonga; however, it was the date of his coronation in 1845 as Tuʻi Kanokupolu, when he took the name Tupou. Tongoleleka and the Niuʻui hospital there (which was destroyed in the 2006 Tonga earthquake) are often stated as his birthplace; however, no evidence supporting this is available, and Lifuka and Tongatapu are also often stated as the birthplace. His father was Tupouto'aʻ, who aspired to be the 17th Tuʻi Kanokupolu, but he was not recognized as such by the high chiefs of Tongatapu, as he was viewed as a low ranking usurper from Haʻapai. His mother, Hoamofaleono, felt her life was at risk on Tongatapu, so she fled with her son to Haʻapai, probably within the year of his birth. Her history, as well as her son Maeakafa's history, is more reliably tracked to Haʻapai Island.

The pregnant Hoamo fale ono felt insecure in Tongatapu as she was about to give birth to a child whose father, Tupouto'a, was the primary adversary of her clan (Ha'a Havea Lahi). Tupouto'a was in Ha'apai to kill Tupounia and 'Ulukalala in order to avenge the assassination of his father, Tuku'aho. Tuku'aho was cruel and feared by all, including Ha'a Havea Lahi chiefs, given such acts as the burning of Fangale'ounga, a Vaini colony of Ma'afutuku'i'aulahi.  Niukapu, a chief, fled to Ha'apai under the protection of the Ha'atalafale Tu'ipelehake. These chiefs supported Tupou Moheofo, installed as Tu'i Kanokupolu, instead of Tuku'aho's father, Mumui. The retribution by Tuku'aho on Ha'a Havea was regarded, despite the fact Niukapu was not part of the clan, as a demotion in power and a display of disrespect of territorial boundaries. Since then, Tuku'aho's siblings and descendants have had antagonistic feelings towards those from Ha'a Havea.

Coronation 
George Tupou was established as the Tuʻi Haʻapai (High king) before the death of his father in 1820. He inherited the conflicts with the overlords of Tongatapu, in particular with Laufilitonga, the last Tuʻi Tonga, who tried to extend his role as spiritual leader into a more political one and contested Tāufaʻāhau in Haʻapai. The culmination of this struggle was the Battle of Velata in 1826, in which Laufilitonga was defeated. An important ally at that battle was the chief of Haʻafeva.

It was now clear that Tāufaʻāhau was very ambitious and wanted more than only Haʻapai. To stop him, in 1827, the chiefs of Tongatapu made Laufilitonga the Tuʻi Tonga, and made Tāufa's uncle Aleamotuʻa a Tuʻi Kanokupolu, preventing an island invasion, as fighting against family members was seen as a Tongan disgrace. In spite of this, at his baptism in 1831, Tāufa declared himself King George of Tonga.

His next conquest resulted from his relationships with Fīnau ʻUlukālala III, the ruler of Vavaʻu. He became the Tuʻi Vavaʻu after Finau's death in 1833. He dedicated Tonga (that is, Pouono in Vavaʻu) to God in 1839, assuring support from the missionaries.

During the 1830s, he resided in Vavaʻu, in Veitatalo, which is now ʻUlukālala's residence. Vavaʻu was at peace and it prospered. Tongatapu, on the other hand, suffered from a cruel civil war with the local chiefs fighting each other. Tāufaʻāhau launched raids on Tongatapu with his fierce warriors from Haʻapai and Vavaʻu, the Tautahi (sea warriors).  However, it was not until Aleamotuʻa's death that year, that he had an excuse to conquer Tongatapu. The chiefs were forced to obey him, and he was installed as Tuʻi Kanokupolu in Kolovai on 4 December. Niuafoʻou and Niuatoputapu would follow later. 'Eua was never conquered by Tāufaʻāhau. However, It was Kauvakauta of 'Eua whom conquered The Mighty Kolo Tau o Velata in Ha'apai and assisted Tāufaʻāhau with guns and ammunition for his wars throughout Tonga.

In 1852, the last independent chief, Takai Mo Fa'e, fell and Tāufa became the undisputed leader of the whole of Tonga. His rule saw many changes in Tongan politics. He abolished serfdom in Vavaʻu in 1835, and published the Vavaʻu Code in 1838, the first written laws in Tonga. However, he would not officially abolish serfdom everywhere in Tonga. He opened the first parliament until 4 June 1862, which is still a public holiday called Emancipation Day, in Tonga.

He made Pangai Ha'apai the first capital of his realm in 1845.  He then moved the capital to Nukuʻalofa in 1851 (resided in Lifuka from 1845 to 1851). On 4 November 1875 (also a holiday), the constitution was promulgated and Tonga officially became a kingdom. Siaosi then took the name George Tupou I, King of Tonga. For this reason, both 1845 and 1875 are quoted as the beginning of his reign.

Death 

He died in 1893 at the age of 95, after a swim in the sea near his palace.  He was buried in the New Royal Cemetery in Malaʻekula. His children had predeceased him, so he was succeeded by his great-grandson twice over George Tupou II – the son of the daughter (ʻElisiva Fusipala Taukiʻonetuku) of his son (Tēvita ʻUnga) and the son (Siaʻosi Fatafehi Toutaitokotaha) of his daughter (Salote Pilolevu Mafileʻo). This makes him one of only two monarchs in history alongside Louis XIV of France who is known to have been succeeded by a great-grandson.

Legacy 
Due to the leadership of King Siaosi I, the history of Tonga is quite different from that of other Polynesian islands. He was a man foreign powers spoke to on equal footing, which protected Tonga from colonization.

During his trip to Australia and New Zealand in 1853, when asking about the beggars he saw, he was told that they were unable to work since they had no land. This led to the constitution stating that land in Tonga could only be given to natural-born Tongans and not sold to outsiders, as is still the case today.

Family tree

References 

 Lātūkefu, S. (1975). King George Tupou I of Tonga. Nukuʻalofa: Tonga Traditions Committee, 37pp. Reprinted from a chapter in J. W. Davidson & Deryck Scarr (eds). (1970). Pacific Islands Portraits. Canberra, Australian National University Press. .
'I.F. Helu; Critical essays: Cultural perspectives from the South seas; 1999

Tongan monarchs
1797 births
1893 deaths
History of Tonga
People from Tongatapu
19th-century monarchs in Oceania